Michel Victor Pachon (May 26, 1867 – 1938) was a French physiologist born in Clermont-Ferrand.

In 1892 he earned his doctorate at the University of Paris, and later became a chief assistant in Paris to physiologists Charles Richet (1850-1935) and Eugène Gley (1857–1930). In 1911 he became a professor of physiology at the medical faculty of the University of Bordeaux. Today, this institution is named "Faculte de médecine Victor Pachon" in his honor. 

Pachon is remembered for his work involving blood pressure and oscillometry; which is defined as the measurement of oscillations used in cardiovascular and respiratory physiology. In 1909 Pachon developed a sphygmographic oscillometer for measuring arterial blood pressure. Pachon's oscillometer was widely used by doctors and technicians during the first half of the twentieth century.

Publications by Pachon that have been translated into English 
 "The measurement of the systolic & diastolic arterial pressure with Pachon's sphygmometric oscillometer". 1912.
 "Clinical investigation of cardiovascular function", 1934.

See also 
 Sphygmomanometer

References
 Michel Victor Pachon @ Who Named It
  Photo and Specifications of Pachon's oscillometer

1867 births
1938 deaths
French physiologists
Scientists from Clermont-Ferrand
Academic staff of the University of Bordeaux